GURPS Bili the Axe – Up Harzburk! is a role-playing campaign of solo adventures for the GURPS role-playing game system, set in Robert Adams's Horseclans universe.

Contents
Bili the Axe – Up Harzburk! is a solo scenario for use with GURPS Horseclans, in which the hero is warrior Bili the Axe, and the scenario follows him through four years of campaigning in the Middle Kingdom. The book includes new combat rules, including combat with animals.

Publication history
Bili the Axe: Up the Harzburk! was written by W.G. Armintrout, with a cover by Ken Kelly, and was published by Steve Jackson Games in 1988 as an 80-page book.

Bili the Axe, as an adventure for GURPS Horseclans, was one of several adventures for the GURPS line, most of which were solo adventures, following the trends of MicroQuests for The Fantasy Trip.

Bili the Axe was recalled by the publisher due to an error that makes the scenario unplayable. The book is notorious for having been printed with a serious error in the numbering of the paragraphs, making it virtually impossible to play the adventure as designed. When Steve Jackson Games discovered the error, it recalled and destroyed all available copies. The adventure has never been republished, and the few copies that were bought in the brief period it was available have become rare collector's items.

References

Fantasy role-playing game adventures
Bili the Axe
GURPS 1st/2nd edition
Role-playing games based on novels
Role-playing game supplements introduced in 1988